A lifestyle center (American English), or lifestyle centre (Commonwealth English), is an open-air shopping center which aims to create a "pedestrian-friendly, town-like atmosphere with sidewalks, landscaping, ambient lighting, and park benches". Memphis developers Poag and McEwen are generally credited with developing the concept in the late 1980s. Lifestyle centers emerged as a major retailing trend in the late 1990s.  Sometimes labeled boutique malls or an ersatz downtown, they are often located in affluent suburban areas.

History
The proliferation of lifestyle centers in the United States accelerated in the 2000s, growing in number from 30 in 2002 to 120 at the end of 2004. They lie on the upscale end of commercial development, with discount-based outlet malls on the low end.

Design
Lifestyle centers typically require less land and may generate higher revenue margins, generating close to $500 per square foot, compared to an average of $330 per square foot for a traditional mall, according to the president of Poag and McEwen. Other advantages lifestyle centers have over traditional enclosed malls are savings on heating and cooling and quicker access for customers. 

Lifestyle centers typically look like strip shopping centers turned inside out, with their formal storefronts facing each other across a landscaped pedestrian walkway or a low volume two-lane road. Those with a more extensive street grid and more multifunctional (offices, hotels, residential, retail and entertainment) and dense development, often with a designated function to act as the community's center, may be dubbed an ersatz downtown. One of the earliest proponents of lifestyle centers was RED Development, which built centers primarily in the Midwest and Southwest United States.

See also
 Festival marketplace
 Shopping mall
 Outlet mall
 Power center

References

External links 
 List of lifestyle centers from USA Today

 
Euphemisms